Pennsylvania Route 823 (PA 823) was a short-lived state highway in the western Pennsylvania county of McKean. The route was commissioned by the Department of Highways (now Pennsylvania Department of Transportation) in 1929 and was decommissioned in 1932.

Route description 
PA 823 began at the community of Big Shanty. The route went northward then turned to the southeast just north of Big Shanty. The route intersected with Toothman Road, a dead-end highway, beyond which it became known as Big Shanty Road, named after the nearby borough. State Route 823 then curved to the northeast, making a gradual, smooth turn to the north. The route then intersected with Lineman Road, another nearby dead-end highway. From here, a set of railroad tracks parallelled nearby, following PA 823 for most of its length. After that, there was an intersection with Droney Road, which headed out to the paralleling railroad tracks.

Just north of Droney Road, PA 823 continued northward into the limits of the borough of Lewis Run. The highway then headed to the northwest, changing its name to Laffayette Avenue. After crossing into Lewis Run, there was an intersection with an unnamed loop road and with Valley Hunt Road, a dead-end highway. The route then turned to the northeast, intersecting with a few more local roads, and terminated at an intersection with US 219 in the northern borough limits of Lewis Run.

History 
PA 823 was designated as a state route in 1929, a year after the mass commissioning of state traffic routes in Pennsylvania. The route served as a spur off US 219. The state route designation, however, did not last long, being decommissioned just three years after its assignment in 1932. The route is now designated and signed by PennDOT as State Route 4001, which extended the state designation from Big Shanty down to nearby PA 59.

Major intersections

See also

References

External links

PA Highways by Jeff Kitsko - Routes 801 - 850

823
Transportation in McKean County, Pennsylvania